Farol de Dona Maria Pia (also known as Farol da Ponta Temerosa or Farol da Praia) is a lighthouse at the southernmost point of the island of Santiago, Cape Verde. It stands on the headland Ponta Temerosa, at the entrance of Praia Harbour, 2 km south of the city centre of Praia. The lighthouse was built in 1881 and was named after Maria Pia of Savoy, queen of Portugal at the time. The octagonal tower is 21 m high and its focal plane is 25 m above mean sea level. It is painted white. The lighthouse is used for navigational purposes.

Gallery

See also
List of lighthouses in Cape Verde
List of buildings and structures in Santiago, Cape Verde

References

External links

Lighthouses completed in 1881
D. Maria Pia
Buildings and structures in Praia
Transport in Santiago, Cape Verde
1880s establishments in Cape Verde
Portuguese colonial architecture in Cape Verde